This is a list of the taekwondo practitioners who will be participating for their country at the 2016 Summer Olympics in Rio de Janeiro, Brazil from  August 5–21, 2016. 128 competitors are set to participate at the Games across eight events.

Male taekwondo practitioners

Female taekwondo practitioners

References

http://www.worldtaekwondofederation.net/athletes/
http://www.worldtaekwondofederation.net/ranking/
http://www.taekwondodata.com/person_search.html

Taekwondo-related lists
Lists of martial artists
practitioners

Taekwondo
Lists of taekwondo practitioners